Mimmi Michaela Sarah Werner (born 17 December 1990), better known as Mimi Werner, is a Swedish singer and songwriter. Werner began her professional music career in 2015, after signing to BMG Scandinavia. She traveled to Nashville to begin writing music, and later released her debut single "Forever Again", an English version of the Swedish song "Strövtåg i hembygden" by Mando Diao.

Werner first achieved national recognition after being announced as a competitor in Melodifestivalen 2016, with the song "Ain't No Good", which became her most successful single to date. She competed in the first semi-final, held in Gothenburg on 6 February 2016, where she placed fifth and was eliminated. Her debut extended play Here We Go Again was released later that year, and also produced the single of the same name, featuring Swedish singer Brolle. Following Melodifestivalen 2016, Werner appeared on several Swedish television programs such as Bingolotto and Doobidoo. She later competed in Melodifestivalen 2018 with the song "Songburning", where she qualified to the second chance round.

Discography

Extended plays

Singles

References

External links 

Living people
1990 births
Swedish country singers
Swedish pop singers
People from Borås
21st-century Swedish singers
21st-century Swedish women singers
Melodifestivalen contestants of 2018
Melodifestivalen contestants of 2016